The following table lists the individuals who served as mayor of Hartford, Connecticut, their political party affiliations, and their dates in office, as well as other information.

History
The city of Hartford switched from a mayor–council government to a council–manager government in 1947. The mayor was chosen from among the city council until 1969, when the mayor began to be directly elected in partisan elections.

In the 1990s and early 2000s, there were three unsuccessful efforts to amend to city charter to switch from a "weak mayor" system to a "strong mayor" system.  Advocates for reform argued a switch to a strong-mayor system would "ameliorate the sense of citizen frustration with the Hartford government and the many problems facing the city," such as a significant drop in the city's population (11.1% from 1990–1994, the largest drop for a large U.S. city), crime, a broken school system (which had been taken over by the state), an overstaffed and costly fire department, and a scandal-ridden police department, as well as lackluster economic development. Under the system then in place, the mayor had no vote in the city council, and had only the power to veto council legislation. The city council was also solely responsible for hiring or firing the city manager, with the mayor having no formal role. The mayor also lacked effective executive power; it was the city manager who appointed and supervised department heads. The mayor could only hire and fire his own secretary. Moreover, the mayor's salary was very low, $30,000, which discouraged qualified candidates from running. Because of this system, the mayor's influence was based solely on his "ability to cobble together a council coalition," and the mayor's functions were mostly those of "a policy advocate rather than a player in policy implementation."

in 2000, proposed charter revisions written by a Charter Revision Commission would have eliminated the city manager, made the mayor the chief executive of the city, increase the mayor's salary from $30,000 to $105,000, increased the size of the city council (from nine to fifteen), and switched to elections of council members by ward rather than at-large. The proposed charter revisions were put to a vote in a city special election; the majority of voters supported the revisions, but the revision fell short of the required 15% of all registered voters, and so the proposal failed.

In January 2002, shortly after taking office, mayor Eddie A. Perez—an advocate for a strong-mayor government—formed a new fifteen-member Charter Review Commission to review the charter and recommend changes. The commission recommended several changes, many of which had been recommended by the previous commission. The revision proposed shifted  to a strong-mayor system in which the mayor would serve as chief executive officer and chief operating officer of the city, appoint a majority of the board of education, appoint all department heads, remove department heads (with the approval of six council members), and prepare and present the annual city budget to the council. On November 5, 2002, the revisions went to a city vote, and all were approved, with about 77% of voters approving the changes, effective with the 2003 election.

List of mayors
The following table lists the individuals who served as mayor of Hartford, Connecticut.

See also
Mayoral elections in Hartford, Connecticut

References

 
 
Hartford, Connecticut
Politics of Connecticut
Hartford